Andrei Georgievich Doroshkevich (born 1937) is a Russian (and former Soviet) theoretical astrophysicist and cosmologist, head of the laboratory on the physics of the early universe at the Lebedev Physical Institute.

He is best known for his work with Igor Novikov, which they published in 1964, providing a theoretical basis for the cosmic microwave background radiation and pointing out that this radiation should be experimentally measurable. The signal of this radiation had been discovered experimentally by T. A. Shmaonov in 1957, but his work had been forgotten even in the Soviet Union by the time of Doroshkevich and Novikov's work. Their own work, also, remained unknown in the west until after the Nobel prize winning rediscovery of the same signal by Arno Penzias and Robert Wilson in 1965.

Selected publications

References

1937 births
Living people
Russian astronomers
Russian astrophysicists
Soviet astronomers
Soviet astrophysicists